Scott Riddell (born 5 October 1985) is the former captain of the Scotland national sevens team and competed in three Commonwealth Games and 74 competitions in the HSBC World Sevens Series as well as play in the 2009, 2013 and 2018 Sevens World Cup since making his Scotland debut in the 2009 Wellington competition. He has also represented Great Britain in the Rugby Europe Sevens Circuit. In 2014/15 season he was named in the London 7s dream team due to his world class performances.

In the 2016 London Sevens, Riddell played an important part in winning Scotland’s first ever series cup as well as making getting his 50th cap for the sevens team.
In the 2017 London Sevens, Riddell played an important part in winning Scotlands second London 7s in two years, as well as beating New Zealand making them the first ever Scottish team to beat New Zealand in any rugby game.

References 

1985 births
Living people
Scottish rugby union players
Scotland international rugby sevens players
Commonwealth Games rugby sevens players of Scotland
Rugby union players from Edinburgh